William Rutledge, also known as Billy Rutledge, (January 1806 – 1 June 1876) was a politician in colonial Victoria (Australia), a member of the Victorian Legislative Council, and later, of the Victorian Legislative Assembly.

Rutledge was the eldest son of James Rutledge, of Ballymagirl (near Bawnboy), County Cavan, Ireland, and Martha, née Forster, of Longford, and reached Sydney, New South Wales aboard the Harriet in December 1829.

Rutledge took sheep overland to Port Phillip District in 1838. He purchased several lots at the early Melbourne land sales and commenced a partnership with Benjamin Baxter, financing him to build cottages in the Port Phillip area at £650 each. At Kilmore Rutledge established a tenant community on a special survey, and although he never took it up he became known as the town's founder and gave land for a Roman Catholic church. In fact all of Charles Bonney, later a famous explorer of South Australia, Dr Richard Julian Hamlyn and the partners Frederick Armand Powlett and John Green preceded Rutledge at Kilmore. Charles Bonney discovered the station for European use on about March 21, 1837 along with pioneering the Sydney Road on the same journey. pp105–120

Rutledge visited Port Fairy in 1843 and soon bought a mercantile firm. He became a magistrate the following year.

On 15 September 1851 Rutledge was elected member for Villiers and Heytesbury in the Victorian Legislative Council 
He was sworn-in November 1851 and held the seat until March 1854. Rutledge was elected to the first Victorian Legislative Assembly for the Electoral district of Villiers and Heytesbury in November 1856, a seat he held until August 1859.

References

 

1806 births
1876 deaths
Members of the Victorian Legislative Assembly
Members of the Victorian Legislative Council
Irish emigrants to colonial Australia
19th-century Australian politicians